The Vang Evangelical Lutheran Church  is a historic church located in Wells County, North Dakota.

Vang Evangelical Lutheran Church was built in 1906 by immigrants from Norway. It is situated at West LeGrand St. in the small unorganized village of 
Manfred, North Dakota and is affiliated with the Evangelical Lutheran Church in America. During 2011, the church became a listed building on the National Register of Historic Places (NRHP).

References

External links

75th anniversary : Vang American Lutheran Church (1970) from the Digital Horizons website

Churches on the National Register of Historic Places in North Dakota
Carpenter Gothic church buildings in North Dakota
Norwegian-American culture in North Dakota
Churches completed in 1906
National Register of Historic Places in Wells County, North Dakota
1906 establishments in North Dakota
Lutheran churches in North Dakota